Essouvert is a commune in the Charente-Maritime department of southwestern France. The municipality was established on 1 January 2016 and consists of the former communes of Saint-Denis-du-Pin and La Benâte.

See also 
 Communes of the Charente-Maritime department

References

External links 
 

Communes of Charente-Maritime
Populated places established in 2016